Gudha is a village in the Bhiwani district of the Indian state of Haryana. , the village had 559 households with a total population of 2,959 of which 1,595 were male and 1,394 female.

References

Villages in Bhiwani district